Samuel McGowan (October 19, 1819 – August 9, 1897) was an American military officer, lawyer, politician, judge, and a Brigadier general  in the Confederate army during the American Civil War. Born in South Carolina, he commanded a brigade in A.P. Hill's famous "Light Division" and was wounded several times. Ezra Warner's book, Generals in Gray, claims that "McGowan's career and reputation were not excelled by any other brigade commander in the Army of Northern Virginia." Following reconstruction, he was elected to the United States Congress but refused to take his seat, later serving as an Associate Justice of the South Carolina Supreme Court.

Early life and education
Born to Irish parents in the Laurens District of South Carolina, McGowan's father was a prosperous farmer who had intended his son to study law. McGowan attended and graduated from South Carolina College in 1841, where he was a member of the Clariosophic Society. Subsequently, he studied law in Abbeville and was admitted to the bar. Prior to the Civil War, McGowan practiced law as partner of Thomas C. Perrin and served in state politics. He volunteered for service in the Mexican–American War and enlisted as a private in the Palmetto Regiment. He was commended for his gallantry near Mexico City, rose to the rank of captain and served as quartermaster and staff officer.

Career

American Civil War
In late 1860 he was appointed to command a brigade of the South Carolinian militia, being a major general in the same, and was present at the attack on Fort Sumter. At the First Battle of Bull Run, McGowan served as an aide-de-camp on the staff of General Milledge Bonham. In September 1861 he was appointed lieutenant colonel of the 14th South Carolina Infantry; and became the Colonel of the regiment in April 1862. The 14th was assigned to Maxcy Gregg's brigade in A.P. Hill's Light Division. After Gregg was killed in the Battle of Fredericksburg, McGowan was promoted to brigadier general (to rank from January 17, 1863) and took command of the Light Division's South Carolina brigade. One of his fellow officers was Abner M. Perrin, the nephew of his former law partner, who would succeed him in command of the regiment. Except for when wounded, McGowan commanded this brigade for the rest of the war, surrendering with it at Appomattox Court House.

McGowan was wounded four times during the Civil War. The first occurrence was at Cold Harbor during the Seven Days Battles on June 27, 1862, where he was bruised in the right side by canister. The second wound happened at Second Manassas when McGowan was hit in the thigh. McGowan suffered his worst wound at Chancellorsville. A Minié ball severely injured McGowan's leg below the knee. Although he kept the leg, it was not until February 1864 that he was able to return to field command. McGowan received his final wound at Spotsylvania where he was hit and suffered a minor wound to the forearm.

Reconstruction
Returning to Abbeville after the war ended, McGowan was elected to Congress as a member of the Conservative Party, but refused his seat. He became a leader in the fight against "carpetbagger" influences in the state's legislature. He was elected as an associate justice of the South Carolina Supreme Court in 1879 and served there until July 1894.

Death
McGowan died in Abbeville August 9, 1897 and was buried there in Upper Long Cane Cemetery.

In reference to Hanz Holzer's book named Ghosts, Samuel McGowen actually may have died in New York City in an apartment building on Fifth Avenue. It was haunted by his ghost and a medium had made contact several times to free his spirit. Samuel was a brigadier and when he left Abbeville, SC, people wouldn't really even recognize that he was gone. His body was never buried in the grave. He did have an affair with a French lady and had a son named Gregory who ended up living in the south. In the book, Samuel's spirit is relentless in Gregory knowing he didn't off himself but was murdered. Samuel's spirit also wanted Gregory to know he wanted him to have things as well, but Samuel's other family from his wife etc, left Gregory nothing.

See also
 List of American Civil War Generals (Confederate)

Notes

References
 
 
 
 
 
 

http://trrcobb.blogspot.com/2014/12/samuel-mcgowan-fifth-avenue-ghost.html?m=1==External links==
 Biographical Sketches: Brig. Gen. Samuel McGowan, South Carolina in the Civil War
 South Carolina Supreme Court Justices: Samuel McGowan
 

1819 births
1897 deaths
American military personnel of the Mexican–American War
American people of Irish descent
Confederate militia generals
Confederate States Army brigadier generals
Conservative Party (South Carolina) politicians
Members of the Aztec Club of 1847
People from Abbeville, South Carolina
People from Laurens County, South Carolina
People of South Carolina in the American Civil War
Justices of the South Carolina Supreme Court
19th-century American judges